Ferdinand Keller (born 30 July 1946 in Munich) is a German former football player. He spent five seasons in the Bundesliga with TSV 1860 Munich, Hannover 96 and Hamburger SV. He represented Germany once, in a friendly against Austria.

Honours
 UEFA Cup Winners' Cup winner: 1976–77

References

External links
 

1946 births
Living people
German footballers
Germany international footballers
TSV 1860 Munich players
Hannover 96 players
Hamburger SV players
Bundesliga players
2. Bundesliga players
Borussia Neunkirchen players
Association football forwards
Footballers from Munich
West German footballers